The 2022 ACT Clay Court International 2 was a professional tennis tournament played on outdoor clay courts. It was the eighth edition of the tournament which was part of the 2022 ITF Women's World Tennis Tour. It took place in Canberra, Australia between 28 March and 3 April 2022.

Singles main draw entrants

Seeds

 1 Rankings are as of 21 March 2022.

Other entrants
The following players received wildcards into the singles main draw:
  Catherine Aulia
  Kimberly Birrell
  Talia Gibson
  Zoe Hives

The following player received entry using a protected ranking:
  Pranjala Yadlapalli

The following players received entry from the qualifying draw:
  Destanee Aiava
  Sowjanya Bavisetti
  Choi Ji-hee
  Merel Hoedt
  Charlotte Kempenaers-Pocz
  Hiroko Kuwata
  Ankita Raina
  Erika Sema

The following player received entry as a lucky loser:
  Alexandra Osborne

Champions

Singles

  Jang Su-jeong def.  Yuki Naito, 6–7(3–7), 6–1, 6–4

Doubles

  Ankita Raina /  Arina Rodionova def.  Fernanda Contreras /  Alana Parnaby, 4–6, 6–2, [11–9]

References

External links
 2022 ACT Clay Court International 2 at ITFtennis.com
 Official website

2022 ITF Women's World Tennis Tour
2022 in Australian tennis
March 2022 sports events in Australia
April 2022 sports events in Australia